Plagiomimicus pityochromus, the black-barred brown, is an owlet moth (family Noctuidae). The species was first described by Augustus Radcliffe Grote in 1873. It is found in North America.

The MONA or Hodges number for Plagiomimicus pityochromus is 9754.

References

Further reading

External links
 

Amphipyrinae
Articles created by Qbugbot
Moths described in 1873